The Vetehinen-class submarine was a Finnish 500-tonne submarine class of three vessels that was designed and built in the 1920s and early 1930s. The Vetehinen class served in the Finnish Navy during World War II. The class was designed by Dutch dummy company Ingenieurskantoor voor Scheepsbouw den Haag (I.v.S) (set up by Germany after World War I in order to maintain and develop German submarine know-how and to circumvent the limitations set by the Treaty of Versailles) and built by the Finnish Crichton-Vulcan shipyard in Turku. The class was based on the German World War I Type UB III and Type UC III submarines and served as prototype for Type VII submarines.

The word vetehinen means a merman. Vetehinen-class submarines were designed as minelaying submarines and were built with mineshafts for 20 mines. Submarines had special inner rails for two torpedo tubes to enable  torpedoes to be used instead of the  torpedoes.

Submarines of the class

References 
 Submarine construction details
 Dutch Export Submarines - Ingenieurskantoor voor Scheepsbouw

Submarine classes